Ng Kwee Khim (born 1 July 1967), best known by her stage name Kym Ng, is a Singaporean television host and actress. She is known as one of Mediacorp’s Variety Ah Jies (综艺阿姐). 

Ng has received numerous accolades locally and regionally.

At the Star Awards, she was recognised with 4 record-breaking Best Variety Show Host wins in 1998, 1999, 2011 and 2013 and two Best Supporting Actress wins in 2018 and 2021. Her win in 1998 made her the first recipient in the former category. In 2019, Ng became the twenty-first artiste to receive the coveted All-Time Favourite Artiste in recognition of winning ten Top 10 Most Popular Female Artistes.

Regionally, Ng was also awarded two Asian Television Awards in 2003 and 2005 and an Asia Rainbow TV Award in 2019.

Early life
Ng was educated at River Valley High School and did pre-university studies (A Levels) at Tanjong Katong Secondary School.

Career
Ng was previously a flight stewardess with Singapore Airlines and began her show business career as a singer. Subsequently, she joined the MediaCorp's predecessor Television Corporation of Singapore in 1995 and switched to hosting and acting. She became known to audiences as host of the popular infotainment programme City Beat alongside Pan Lingling, Lina Ng, Sharon Au and Bryan Wong. Her performance in the programme earned Ng her first two wins in the coveted Best Variety Show Host award at the Star Awards. In 2001, she left MediaCorp and joined SPH MediaWorks. But after four years, SPH MediaWorks merged with MediaCorp and Ng was transferred back to MediaCorp.

Although bilingual, Ng is most often seen on Chinese language programmes on Channel 8 and Channel U. She is known for her direct connection with the audience and her bubbly nature. She often hosts "food reviews" and variety shows. Since returning to MediaCorp, Ng has enjoyed success and has hosted more than 150 shows since the start of her television career.

In 2005, Ng was approached by director Wee Li Lin to star in the film, Gone Shopping. Her performance was stated by the Straits Times as "(Kym) Ng is a revelation here. Her role Clara, who could have been a self-indulgent bore of a character, is beguilingly shy, naively yearning and sweetly forlorn." The film took two years to complete (June 2005 to July 2007). Ng was quoted on U-weekly magazine that she was mentally prepared that the film would not follow through. The principal shoot of the film commenced in December 2006 to March 2007.

In 2011, Ng hosted the highly acclaimed variety show Love on a Plate. The programme won Best Variety Programme and gotten Ng her third Best Variety Show Host win at the Star Awards 2011. It also won a "highly commended" recognition for Best Reality Programme at the 2011 Asian Television Awards. Her performance in Jobs Around the World bagged Ng her fourth Best Variety Show Host win, tying her with Sharon Au and Mark Lee for the record of most wins in the category.

For acting, her role as the repressed Luo Na in "It Takes Two" secured Ng her first Best Actress nomination at the Star Awards. It was her second acting performance award nomination, following her Best Supporting Actress-nominated role as Hai De in The New Adventures of Wisely in 1998. At Star Awards 2018, her supporting role as Lu Meiguang in When Duty Calls garnered Ng her first acting performance award win at the award show. The win marks Ng's second acting performance award of her career, after being recognised at the 2005 Asian Television Awards for Best Comedy Performance by an Actress for her role in Durian King.

In Star Awards 2019, Ng received the All-Time Favourite Artiste  after winning the Top 10 Most Popular Female Artistes award from 1998-1999, 2006–2007, 2012–2013 and 2015–2018. Currently, she is the co-host of The Sheng Siong Show, together with Dasmond Koh and Seow Sin Nee.

Personal life
Ng comes from a working-class family of four children. In 2009 she secretly married her long-time boyfriend at a simple ceremony overseas. She is known for zealously safeguarding her privacy and rarely discloses her private life or personal details to the media. Ng also disclosed that she does not intend to have children because caring for a child in the long run is too much of a hassle.

Ng suffered from hyperthyroidism since 2000.

Filmography

Variety/Infotainment show
1991. – 2000.
City Beat 城人杂志
欢乐大放送
超级幸运夜
Comedy Nite 搞笑行动
PSC Nite 普威之夜
一见钟情
Mini Concerts
2000 – 2001
SNAP 全星总动员
Happy Rules 开心就好
Live Unlimited 综艺无界限
2002
SNAP 2 全星总动员2
Snap Special – Channel U's 2nd Year Anniversary 全星总动员 – 优频道2周年纪念版
Celebrity Travellers 自由万岁
Mission Possible 地球无界线
2003
Ren Ci Charity Show 2003 仁心慈爱照万千2003 (Performance: Pizza twirling)
Add Your Service 服务加加加
Snap Special – Romance Of The Book and Sword 全星总动员 – 书剑总动员版
Everybody's Talking – (Translator of Teochew for SARS prevention programme) 人人有话说 – 担任潮州翻译
Beyond the Camourflage 与军共武
Top Ten 十不相瞒
Food Train 食在必行
Bon Voyage 一路风光
2004
Ren Ci Charity Show 2004 仁心慈爱照万千2004 (Stunt: Walking across 45-storey high makeshift bridge from Suntec Tower 1 to Tower 2)
SNAP 3 全星总动员3
Ultimate Tastebud 食在好吃
Mama Mia All Star Potluck 食星报喜
Food Train 2 食在必行2
The Next Big Thing 全民偶像新登场
2005
Ren Ci Charity Show 2005 仁心慈爱照万千2005 (Duo skit/stunt (With Mark Lee): Do household chores hanging upside down)
Lunar New Year Special – Year of Rooster 天鸡报喜贺新春
Chingay Parade of Dreams 2005 装艺大游行之奇思梦想
Love Bites 缘来就是你
The NKF Cancer Show 1 群星照亮千万心之风雨同舟献真心 (Duo performance (With Bryan Wong): Paper Art – Impersonation/costume changing skit)
The NKF Cancer Show 2 群星照亮千万心之 (Stunt performance: Rescue mission & Stacking up)
Perfect 10 十分十全十美
Pretty Woman 想得美
National Day Parade 2005 国庆庆典2005
Get It Right 正是如此
Oral B Smile Oral B 笑一笑, 比一比
Love Bites 2 缘来就是你 2
Small Kids, Big Wits 谁敢小看我
Star Idol 明星偶像
Superhost (评审) 超级主持人 (Judge)
Affairs Of The Heart 2005 心手相连2005 (Duo performance (With Quan Yi Fong): Fluorescent stunt
2006
Ren Ci Charity Show 2006 仁心慈爱照万千2006 (Stunt performance: The Mermaid)
Lunar New Year Special – Year of Dog
Pretty Woman 2 想·得·美2
Never Say Die 永不言败
Vesak Day Special 卫塞节特备节目 (Er-hu performance: 呼唤 (大长今主题曲))
Its Showtime! 全民创意争霸赛
Hey Hey Taxi 比比接车无比乐
My Star Guide – Spain 我的导游是明星 – 西班牙
HDB Tai Tai HDB 太太
Giant Stars 2006　Giant 星光灿烂 2006
Love at Marina Square (6 One-minute episode drama)
Ultimate Comedian (Guest Judge) 爆笑新人王 (嘉宾评审)
Who's Naughty and Nice 黑白讲
Fact or Fiction? 真相大点击
2007
Ren Ci Charity Show 2007 仁心慈爱照万千2007 (Piano performance: Ebony & Ivory)
Lunar New Year Special – Year of Pig 金猪贺岁庆肥年 2007 (@ Studio)
HDB Tai Tai 2 HDB太太2
Never Too Old 新领屋
Get It Right 2 正是如此2
Makeover Pte Ltd 请你来变装
Code Red 爱上小红点
Sheng Siong Show 缤纷万千在昇松
Hey Gorgeous (Guest host) 校花校草追赶跑 (嘉宾主持)
The Cancer Charity Show 2007 癌过有晴天 2007 (歌舞表演: 满场飞, 情花开, 说不出的快活)
The President's Star Charity 2007 (Group Song & Dance performance: Kal Ho Naa Ho)
Star Awards 2007 Prelude 星光隧道 2007
Bioskin Dreams Come True Bioskin 要你好看
Wow Singapore 全新体验
Sheng Siong Show 2 缤纷万千在昇松 2
2008
Lunar New Year Special – Year of Rat 八方祥瑞鼠来宝 (@ Studio, Host/Skit performance)
Buzzing Cashier 抢摊大行动
U Are The One 唯我独尊
The SiChuan Earthquake Charity Show 让爱川流不息 (Group song performance: 感恩的心)
President's Star Charity 2008 (Solo song performance: 说不出的快活)
Her Sense 女人香
My Star Guide 3 – Japan 我的导游是明星3 – 日本
The Sheng Siong Show III 缤纷万千在昇菘III
Food Hometown – Teochew 美食寻根 – 潮州
Love Matters (Guest Host)
3 Plus 1 Series 三菜一汤 (as Guest, VS Michelle Chia)
Celeb's A Cook 名厨大冻作 (as Guest, Ep 6)
Supreme Matron 超级好管家
Super Tots 我是俏宝宝
The Sheng Siong Show IV 缤纷万千在昇菘IV
Channel 8 Countdown Party 2009 八频道跨年派对
2009
Lunar New Year's Eve Special – Year of Ox 牛转乾坤喜临门 (@ Studio)
The Sheng Siong Show V 缤纷万千在昇菘V
Buzzing Cashier 2 抢摊大行动 2
Easy Cooking 七步成食
New City Beat 城人新杂志
SPD Charity Show 真情无障爱 (Duo performance: Er Hu (with Zoe Tay – Dance)
True Hearts 2009 公益献爱心 (Guest Host 嘉宾主持)
The Sheng Siong Show VI 缤纷万千在昇菘VI
Fashion Asia 亚洲时尚风 – Bangkok 曼谷
CelebriTea Break 2 (Guo Liang's special guest) (艺点心思 2) (郭亮 – 好友嘉宾)
Channel 8 Countdown Party 2010 at VivoCity 八频道跨年派对 2010
SMRT Challenge 2009 SMRT大挑战 2009
2010
Lunar New Year's Eve Special – Year of Tiger 普天同庆金虎年 (@ Chinatown, Guest performance: 小妹去拜年)
Ren Ci Charity Show 2010 仁心慈爱照万千2010
Black Rose 爆料黑玫瑰
Star Awards 2010 Show 1 红星大奖2010 第一场 (18 April 2010)
The Sheng Siong Show VII 缤纷万千在昇菘 VII
New City Beat 2 城人新杂志 2
Don't Forget The Lyrics (Chinese celebrities special) 我要唱下去 (艺人版 Celebrities series) (Guest appearance)
Love on a Plate 名厨出走记 (Variety Blockbuster)
Buffetlicious (Guest Host)
Loving Touch 关怀方式 (Guest Host)
同济医院慈善夜 Thong Chai Charity Show
Singapore Hit Awards 2010 第15届新加坡金曲奖 (Guest award presenter)
Gatekeepers 小兵迎大将 (Guest appearance)
The Sheng Siong Show VIII 缤纷万千在昇菘VIII
Dream Potter 梦。窑匠 (Guest Host)
Home Makeover 玩家万岁
2011
Lunar New Year's Eve Special – Year of Rabbit 金兔呈祥喜迎春 (@ Chinatown)
Chef Apprentice 名厨实习生
Power Duet K歌2击队 (Duet performance with Dasmond Koh: 美丽的神话, won in Celebrities' episode)
Star Awards 2011 Show 1 红星大奖2011 第一场
Buffetlicious 2 永远吃不肥2 (Guest Host)
HDB Tai Tai 3 HDB太太3
The Sheng Siong Show 9 缤纷万千在昇菘 9
The Sheng Siong Show 10 缤纷万千在昇菘 10
My Star Guide 4 – Sri Lanka 我的导游是明星4 – 斯里兰卡
The Silver Tribute Charity Night 2011 万千金辉照乐年 2011 (Group performance: African drum)
President's Star Charity 2011 (Group performance: Ballroom dancing)
3 Plus 1 Series 3 三菜一汤3 (as Guest, partner with Guo Liang VS Taiwan celebrities 宋达民 & 黄腾浩)
Sizzlng Woks 3  煮炒来咯！3
Show Me The Money 钱哪里有问题
Foodie Dash 食品大赢家 (Guest appearance)
SMRT Challenge 2011 SMRT大挑战 2011
Channel 8 Countdown Party 2012 8频道跨年派对2012 (Guest performance)
2012
Lunar New Year's Eve Special – Year of Dragon 金龙腾飞庆丰年 (@ Studio)
Thye Hua Kwan Charity Show 2012 (Performing group – Belly Dance) 太和观一心一德为善乐 2012 (表演: 肚皮舞)
Just Noodles 面对面
Knock Knock Who's There (Guest Judge, Ep 10 & 13) 啊! 是你到我家 (嘉宾评审, 第10 & 13集)
Melting Pot (Guest) 新新料理 (嘉宾)
The Sheng Siong Show 11 缤纷万千在昇菘 11
The Sheng Siong Show 12 缤纷万千在昇菘 12
Battle @ Water Margin 我爱水浒传
Jobs around the world 走遍天涯打工乐
S.N.A.P 熠熠星光总动员
MediaCorp 30th Anniversary Drama Show 戏剧情牵30年
Channel 8 Countdown Party 2013 8频道跨年派对2013
2013
Lunar New Year's Eve Special – Year of Snake 灵蛇贺新春 (@ Studio)
Makan Places Lost N Found (Guest)
Ladies' Nite 2 女人俱乐部 2
Laughing Out Loud 笑笑没烦恼
The Sheng Siong Show 13 缤纷万千在昇菘 13
Body SOS 2（Guest: Episode 9 & 10 [Insomnia]) 小毛病，大问题 2 (嘉宾: 第9 & 10集 [失眠])
The Joy Truck（Guest: Episode 2) 快乐速递 (嘉宾: 第2集)
Stir It Up 电视拌饭
Finding U 寻U先锋
My Grand Partner! 大小拍档
President's Star Charity 2013 (Group performance: Dance)
My Star Guide 9 – Sydney/Melbourne 我的导游是明星9 – 悉尼/墨尔本
The Sheng Siong Show 14 缤纷万千在昇菘 14
Volkswagen Holiday On Wheels (Guest: Episode 2 & 3) 陪你兜兜风 (嘉宾: 第2 & 3集)
Counter Fake (Guest) 识货衙门 (嘉宾)
Where The Queue Starts 4 (Guest) 排排站，查查看 4 (嘉宾)
I Weekly Show (Guest: Episode 3 & 4) i不释手 (嘉宾: 第3 & 4集)
Singapore Hit Awards 2013 第18届新加坡金曲奖 (Guest award presenter)
Countdown TV 50 电视欢庆50周年
2014
Lunar New Year's Eve Special – Year of Horse 俊马奔腾喜迎春 (@ Studio)
The Sheng Siong Show 15 缤纷万千在昇菘 15
3 Plus 1 Series 4 三菜一汤4 (as Guest in Episode 5)
Le Petit Chef 我的师傅是大厨 (嘉宾: 第9集)
Back To School 超龄插班生 (嘉宾: 第1集)
Neighbourhood Chef 邻里厨王
Cheap and Good 便宜有好货
Black Rose 2 爆料黑玫瑰 2
The Sheng Siong Show 16 缤纷万千在昇菘 16
Finding 8 先锋争8战
2015
The Sheng Siong Show 17 缤纷万千在昇菘 17
The Sheng Siong Show 18 缤纷万千在昇菘 18
My Star Guide 10 – Japan 我的导游是明星10 – 日本
The Games We Played 那些年，我们一起玩的游戏 (Guest: Episode 1 & 4)
The 5 Show as Ibu Tjio (Outdoor segment with Irene Ang)
Body SOS 3 小毛病 大问题 3 (Guest)
Ladies Nite 3 女人俱乐部 3 (Guest: Episode 5 – 12)
What Your School Doesn't Teach You 学校没教的事 (Guest: Episode 9)
2016
Life Hacks 没那么简单
Touch Screen Cuisine 弹指间的料理 (Guest: Episode 3)
Hearts and Hugs 爱心72小时 (Guest Artiste: Episode 2 – Activity: Running)
The Sheng Siong Show 19 缤纷万千在昇菘 19
Just Cook It 一起来下厨
The Sheng Siong Show 20 缤纷万千在昇菘 20
2017
Happy Can Already! 欢喜就好 (Guest: Episode 8)
The Sheng Siong Show 21 缤纷万千在昇菘 21
Ah Ma Can Cook 阿妈来做饭
What's in the fridge 2 冰箱的秘密2 (Guest: Episode 4)
The Sheng Siong Show 21 缤纷万千在昇菘 22
Buzzing Hawkers
2018
Lunar New Year's Eve Special – Year of Dog 阿狗狗旺旺过好年 (@ Chinatown)
2019
The Destined One

Film

Television

Compilation album

Discography

Awards and nominations
Throughout her hosting and acting career, Ng has received various awards and accolades.

To date, at the Star Awards, Ng has received 19 performance nominations, winning 6 - four Best Variety Show Host Awards and two Best Supporting Actress Award. She was the first recipient and one of the three record holders for the most wins in the former category. At the  25th Awards Ceremony, Ng received the All-Time Favourite Artiste in recognition of winning ten Top 10 Most Popular Female Artistes awards. She was the eleventh female artiste (and twenty-first overall) to receive the accolade.

Regionally, Ng received 2 Asian Television Awards – Best Entertainment Presenter for Top Ten in 2003 and Best Comedy Performance by an Actress for Durian King in 2005 and Outstanding Host Award at the Asian Rainbow TV Awards in 2019 for Ah Ma Can Cook.

References

External links

Living people
Singaporean people of Teochew descent
Singaporean television actresses
1967 births